Mount Clinton is an unincorporated community located in Rockingham County, in the U.S. state of Virginia. It is located northeast of Clover Hill. There are several Mennonite churches in the vicinity, one of which is located along the access road to the west.
It is two miles north of Hinton.

References

Mennonitism in Virginia
Unincorporated communities in Rockingham County, Virginia
Unincorporated communities in Virginia